The Garden State Quartet is a Barbershop quartet from Jersey City, NJ, that won the 1946 SPEBSQSA international competition. Members included Ted Rau (tenor), Bob Freeland (lead), Jack Briody (baritone) and Joe Marrese (bass).

References
 AIC entry (archived)

Barbershop quartets
Barbershop Harmony Society